Diana Morgan may refer to:
Diana Morgan (screenwriter) (1908–1996), British playwright, screenwriter and novelist
Diana Morgan (actress) (born 1951), American actress and former television news personality